KEXS-FM (106.1 FM) is a radio station licensed to Ravenwood, Missouri, United States, broadcasting a religious format. The station is currently owned by Catholic Radio Network.

References

External links
 

Radio stations established in 1972
Catholic radio stations
EXS-FM